Stupidity is the ninth and final studio album by British 2 Tone and ska band Bad Manners, released on 17 June 2003.

Track listing

 All songs by Bad Manners unless noted.

 "Fatman" (Neil Hefti)
 "Can't Take My Eyes off You" (Bob Crewe, Bob Gaudio) [not hsm version]
 "Happy"  
 "What Ya Gonna Do"  
 "Black Night" (Ritchie Blackmore)
 "I'm a Mummy" (Bob McFadden, Rod McKuen)
 "Way out Mummy" (Robert Ritterbusch)
 "Teddy Bears Picnic" (J.W. Bratton)
 "Cider Drinker"  (The Wurzels)
 "Tossin"  
 "Dat Think There"  (Pluto Shevrington)
 "I Don't Care" (Copyright Control)
 "Do Nothing" (Golding)
 "Eng-Er-Land" (Copyright Control)
 "Hoots Mon" (Lord Rockingham's XI)
 "Manners Knees-Up"  (Copyright Control)

Personnel

Buster Bloodvessel – Lead Vocals & Production
Louis Alphonso – Guitar, Additional Keyboards & Production
Alan Perry – Alto Saxophone & Backing Vocals
Lee Thompson – Bass
Rickesh Macwana – Keyboards
Trevor Irving – Trumpet
Warren Middleton – Trombone
Matt Godwin – Saxophone
Tony 'Treacle' Richardson – Saxophone
Tony Ardin – Saxophone
Carlton Hunt – Drums
Russel Wynn – Percussion
Simon Cuell – Guitar, Backing Vocals & Production
Chris Bull – Trumpet
Trevor Swift – Saxophone
John Gale – Saxophone
Dave Welton – Bass Trombone
Chris Welch – Trumpet
Alex Arudel – Trumpet
Carlton Hunt – Percussion
Mark Harrison – Drums
John Thompson – Bass
Steve Armstrong – Guitar
Phil Baptiste – Drums
Dave Turner – Harmonica
Anton O'Dochertaigh – Bagpipes
Peter Ker – Engineer & Production
Glover – Additional Production
Engineered by Mikey Miller
Recorded at 811 Studios, Cowfold, Sussex

References

External links 

 Stupidity on Discogs
 Stupidity on MusicBrainz

2003 albums
Bad Manners albums